Cal McCrystal is an Irish theatre director and actor. He is the brother of the journalist Damien McCrystal and the son of the journalist and writer Cal McCrystal. Following an early career acting in theatre, television, radio plays and commercials, McCrystal became a director specialising in comedy. His notable credits include Physical Comedy Director on the National Theatre's One Man, Two Guvnors starring James Corden and physical comedy consultant on Paddington and Paddington 2. In 2018, he directed a new production of Gilbert and Sullivan's Iolanthe for the English National Opera.

Early career and acting
McCrystal trained at the Royal Scottish Academy of Music and Drama, winning a contract with Yorkshire TV upon graduation in 1981 to present young people's programmes. He had regular roles in various Saturday morning children's shows, including What's Up Doc? and Motormouth on ITV alongside Gaby Roslin, Andy Crane and Siobhan Finneran.

McCrystal also appeared in more than 30 TV commercials, including one for Hamlet Cigars in which he portrayed Sir Walter Raleigh as part of their long-running Happiness is a cigar called Hamlet campaign. His other TV work includes The Detectives, The Wild House and a 1997 BBC adaptation of The History Of Tom Jones, A Foundling. He also has performed multiple stage roles, including Hans in Spring Awakening at the Young Vic in 1984 and Florindo in The Servant Of Two Masters at the Sheffield Crucible in 1995.

On film, McCrystal has appeared in George Sluizer's Crimetime and as Principal Conway opposite Andrew Garfield and Emma Stone in Marc Webb's The Amazing Spider-Man 2.

Comedy/Theatre director
After training under European clown-theatre gurus Pierre Byland and Philippe Gaulier, McCrystal moved into theatre directing. His first show was Let The Donkey Go with the innovative theatre company Peepolykus. It became the surprise hit of the 1996 Edinburgh Fringe festival and led to two more shows with Peepolykus, I Am A Coffee and the Chekhov spoof Horses For Courses.

Described as "Britain's funniest director", McCrystal's shows are known for their chaotic physical comedy elements and irreverence.

After Peepolykus, McCrystal went on to direct stage productions for the Cambridge Footlights, including their 1998 show Between A Rock And A Hard Place which starred Richard Ayoade and John Oliver, and The Mighty Boosh. Some of his most acclaimed work came with the internationally successful clown troupe Spymonkey. After directing the clown sequences for Cirque Du Soleil's touring show Varekai, McCrystal returned in an expanded role on the company's Las Vegas-based erotic cabaret Zumanity, incorporating Spymonkey as the show's comedy act.

In 2003, McCrystal directed an acclaimed production of Joe Orton's Loot at the Derby Playhouse. He returned to the Playhouse two further times for productions of Kafka's Dick and The Killing of Sister George, the latter starring British comedian Jenny Eclair and Carla Mendonça.

In 2011, McCrystal was invited by Nicholas Hytner to work alongside him as Associate Director on the National Theatre's production of Richard Bean's One Man, Two Guvnors, a reworking of Carlo Goldoni's 18th century Commedia dell’arte play The Servant Of Two Masters. McCrystal's broad input into the production included staging the renowned slapstick dinner scene at the end of Act One and was highlighted as a significant factor in the show's success. Hytner wrote: "Much of what is funniest in One Man, Two Guvnors was created by Cal McCrystal, my associate director, who is a great master of physical comedy." McCrystal's title was changed to Physical Comedy Director for the production's West End and Broadway transfers.

In 2012, McCrystal became the first director since 1977 to be granted permission by Alan Ayckbourn to stage his play Mr Whatnot for a 50th anniversary revival at the Royal Theatre (Northampton). The play received favourable reviews.

In 2014, McCrystal directed his first opera, Life On The Moon, an adaptation of Joseph Haydn’s Il Mondo Della Luna, for English Touring Opera. The same year he also directed Noel Fielding in his stand-up show, An Evening With Noel Fielding, and Ambassador Theatre Group's Christmas pantomime Peter Pan starring English television personality Bradley Walsh at Milton Keynes Theatre.

Since 2012, McCrystal has been director of Giffords Circus, the traditional English touring circus. In recent years, he has also directed several productions at the Royal Court Theatre, Liverpool: Canoeing For Beginners in 2014, The Royal in 2016 and The Scouse Nativity in 2017.

In 2016, he was Comedy Director on the Royal Shakespeare Company's Don Quixote starring David Threlfall and Rufus Hound, with reviewers highlighting McCrystal's contribution to a production acclaimed as "joyous" and "exuberant".

In 2019, he directed a production of Lennox Robinson's Drama At Inish at the Abbey Theatre. The production was his first at the theatre.

ENO's Iolanthe

In February 2018, McCrystal made his English National Opera (ENO) debut with Gilbert and Sullivan’s satirical fantasy Iolanthe, which received extensive press coverage before the production opened. McCrystal was interviewed by The Daily Telegraph, The Sunday Times and The Times among others, and wrote a piece for The Guardian outlining his approach to Gilbert and Sullivan's operetta.

Iolanthe garnered strong reviews and became a substantial hit for the ENO. The Financial Times praised the production as “an all-round, knockout success”, and The Spectator described it as "a mischievous, daring production that produces the goods".

Films
McCrystal has served as a physical comedy consultant on several feature films, including The Dictator and The World's End. He was brought in by Andrew Garfield and Marc Webb to help devise comic sequences for The Amazing Spider-Man 2. Garfield described it as "a really cool thing" having McCrystal onboard the superhero sequel as a comedy expert.

McCrystal appeared in the sequel film Paddington 2, as Sir Geoffrey Wilcott. He also helped to create multiple scenes in the first Paddington film using a motion-capture suit. 

He has also directed a feature version of The Bubonic Play, adapted from a stage production he devised for the 2005 Edinburgh Fringe Festival with a cast including Mathew Baynton.

Awards and nominations

Perrier Comedy Awards
Winner
 1998 Best Newcomer, The Mighty Boosh

Olivier Awards
Nominations
 2012 Best New Play, One Man, Two Guvnors

One Man, Two Guvnors received five nominations in total

Tony Awards
One Man, Two Guvnors received seven nominations in total

Selected other work
Television
 Behind The Bike Sheds 
 The Tenpercenters
 EastEnders
 The Bill

Theatre
 1984: Willy Russell's Stags and Hens at the Chester Gateway Theatre
 1997: Francis Flute in The Popular Mechanicals, directed by Geoffrey Rush, at the Arts Theatre, London

References

External links
 
 
 Official site

Male actors from Belfast
Living people
1959 births